Bromham may refer to:

 Bromham, Bedfordshire, a village in the county of Bedfordshire, England
 Bromham, Wiltshire, a village in the county of Wiltshire, England